Kunhikuttan Thampuran (1864–1913) was an Indian poet from Kodungallur, Kerala. He was a member of the royal family. He was the son of Venmani Achan Nampoothiripad and Kunchipilla Thampurati and was born on Malayalam era 1040 Kanni 4. His actual name was Rama Varma. He was popularly known as Kerala Vyasan, meaning Vyasan of Kerala.

Published works
Kavibharatam (1893) 
Thuppalkolambi (1910) 
Kamson (1911) 
Palulli Charitham (1925)
Ratnapanchakam

References

1864 births
1913 deaths
Malayali people
Malayalam poets
People from Thrissur district
19th-century Indian poets
20th-century Indian poets
Indian male poets
Poets from Kerala
19th-century Indian male writers
20th-century Indian male writers